The siege of Gundishapur took place in 642. It was the last major city in Khuzestan to fall to the Arabs. According to al-Tabari and al-Baladhuri, the Arab general Abu Musa Ashaari marched to Gundishapur and besieged the city. The cities defences were weak and after a few days the city surrendered and opened its gate. Abu Musa then made peace with the city in return for tribute, which the city accepted. However, some inhabitants of the city refused to live under the rule of the Rashidun Caliphate, and fled to Kalbaniyah. Abu Musa then went to the city and easily seized it. He thereafter seized a few other small cities, thus completing the conquest of Khuzestan.

References

Sources 

Gundishapur
Gundishapur
Gundishapur
Muslim conquest of Persia